

Cabinet

Sources

Government of South Africa
Executive branch of the government of South Africa
Cabinets of South Africa
1915 establishments in South Africa
1920 disestablishments in South Africa
Cabinets established in 1915
Cabinets disestablished in 1920